WOWIO is a deregistered company based in the United States. WOWIO, Inc. has, historically, operated a digital media and technology development company with a patented process and a proprietary mobile ad-delivery platform that planned to disrupt the eBook distribution landscape by exploiting a previously untapped marketplace: ad-supported eBooks. A new management team announced in 2017 that Wowio will be a holding company supporting a number of investments in entertainment, restaurants, tourism, hospitality and other businesses including homebuilding in Northern California and the real estate development in Arizona.

WOWIO's chairman is Brian Altounian, a former Time Warner executive, founder of Alliance Acquisitions, and former board member (from 2005-2011) of Platinum Studios.  Mr. Altounian served as the Chief Executive Officer of WOWIO, Inc. from June 11, 2010 to September 2015. During Mr. Altounian's last months as CEO, Wowio went public with an initial share price over $1; within months, the share price fell below $0.01. Robert H. Estareja, President of Wowio since February 2015, replaced Mr. Altounian as CEO in September 2015. In 2017, Mr. Estareja was replaced with a new CEO, Tony Anish, who announced the new strategic direction for the company. The company deregistered its common stock in July 2018.

History
WOWIO was founded in 2006 in Los Angeles by "author and entrepreneur" William Lidwell. Its original goal was to provide readers with free, downloadable E-books in exchange for embedded advertisements. Initial offerings in the WOWIO catalogue included public domain titles like Wuthering Heights and Frankenstein, and comic book titles like the Tenth Muse series.

In June 2008, Platinum Studios announced that it had begun talks to acquire WOWIO, hoping to make it a "major cornerstone" of "a global digital publishing distribution initiative." The companies projected that the acquisition would be concluded early in the third quarter of 2008, but issues related to WOWIO's non-payment of quarterly earnings delayed the sale.

In June 2009, WOWIO was purchased outright by Brian Altounian, formerly Platinum Studios' COO (at the time he was still a director). Altounian's company Alliance Acquisitions, LLC is a minority owner, along with a group of investors; Platinum Studios no longer has any ownership stake or percentage. Third quarter earnings for 2008, calculated on a new formula more favorable to WOWIO, were eventually paid. Based on activities from 2008-2011, the State of California found that Mr. Altounian and his company, Alliance Acquisitions, had offered or sold securities by means of untrue or misleading statements and was ordered in 2015 to desist from such activity.

In June 2010, WOWIO raised $1.7 million and purchased the online community WEvolt. WEvolt, which was created by Jason Badower (a comic artist from Australia who has illustrated and colored several Heroes graphic novels) and Matt Jacobs, was a company that enabled comic book artists to create and share their work with their fans. Its online platform allows creators of comics (and eventually other media) to generate revenues by participating in ad sales and other activities such as merchandising. Users can create and submit their original material for broader distribution consideration, or they can simply use the site as an aggregator of their favorite online content.

A week after its purchase of Wevolt, WOWIO acquired DrunkDuck.com from Platinum Studios. DrunkDuck was a webcomics community of mostly amateur creators mixed with some Platinum Studios-owned professional titles. At the time of its purchase by WOWIO, the DrunkDuck community claimed 95,000 subscribed users.

By 2013, Wowio distributed content across five proprietary websites, including www.WOWIO.com, www.drunkduck.com, www.theduckwebcomics.com, www.WEvolt.com and www.popgalaxy.com, as well as YouTube. Most of these websites, as well as a new website launched in 2014, www.studiowdigital.com, became and remain inactive within the next few years. The PopGalaxy YouTube channel has 106 subscribers and stopped posting new content in 2014.

In the middle of August 2013 the Drunk Duck site went offline. After repeated delays, the website briefly returned in September 2013, only to soon go offline again. On October 10, 2013, the site was brought back, now rebranded as TheDuckWebcomics.com.

In 2017, new management recognized that "the Company has been dormant due to a lack of funding and the inability to take the products they have been working on to market" and changed the strategic direction of the company. The new plan for the company is to be "a holding company supporting a number of investments in entertaining, restaurants, tourism and other businesses including housebuilding in Northern California and the development of property in Arizona." Investments include Castlerock Bar and Grill, Canyon Café, and Wishing Well restaurant in Arizona; Lodgenuity, a hospitality consulting and management company; and land in Avenal, California to build low-income housing. The company deregistered its common stock in July 2018.

Titles 
 BUMP (Fangoria Comics/The Scream Factory)
 Clive Barker's Hellraiser: Collected Best, Volume 1
 Darkchylde
 Day by Day (Chris Muir)
 Dead with Dick & Jane (KS Comics)
 Dee Snider's Strangeland: Seven Sins (Fangoria Comics/The Scream Factory)
 Elsinore (Devil's Due Digital)
 G.R.A.V.E. Grrrls: Destroyers of the Dead (The Scream Factory)
 Hero Happy Hour (GeekPunk)
 Last Blood (Blatant Comics)
 Lullaby (Alias Comics)
 No Need for Bushido
 Robert Kurtzman's Beneath The Valley of The Rage (Fangoria Comics/The Scream Factory)
 The X-Files (Devil's Due Digital)

References

External links

 TheDuckWebcomics.com
 Pop Galaxy YouTube channel

Companies based in Los Angeles
American companies established in 2006